Wisimar or Visimar (?-335) was a Vandal ruler of the Hasdingi tribe during the 4th century in Europe. Although this historical figure is overwhelmingly shadowed by a lack of historical data, he is noted as one of the early monarchs of the Vandals. His territorial extent occupied regions of today's Transilvania in Romania, Tisza in Ukraine and a part of then-Roman province Dacia. It is most likely that he died during the neighboring Visigoth breakthrough of Geberic in 335.

See also
 Fastida

References
Geary, Patrick J. Readings in Medieval History. (Orchard Park: Broadview Press, 2003) p. 91.
Dahn, Die Könige der Germanen I, 1860. S. 140 und die dort Angeführten.

Kings of the Vandals
Vandal warriors
4th-century monarchs in Europe